Saniyah Zia (born 11 April 1985) is a Pakistani born Canadian cricketer. She played for Canada at the 2013 ICC Women's World Twenty20 Qualifier.

In May 2019, she was named in Canada's squad for the 2019 ICC Women's Qualifier Americas tournament against the United States. She made her WT20I debut for Canada against the United States in the Americas Qualifier on 17 May 2019.

In October 2021, she was named in the Canadian team for the 2021 ICC Women's T20 World Cup Americas Qualifier tournament in Mexico.

References

External links 
 
 Profile at CricHQ

1985 births
Living people
Canadian women cricketers
Canada women Twenty20 International cricketers
Pakistani emigrants to Canada
Naturalized citizens of Canada
Pakistani expatriates in Canada